Eastern Orthodox calendar may refer to:

 Eastern Orthodox liturgical year
 Julian calendar (sometimes referred to as the "Old Calendar")
 Revised Julian calendar, a quasi-Gregorian 1923 scheme (sometimes referred to as the "New Calendar")